Terrein achter de Watertoren (English: Terrain behind the Watertower) was a football stadium in Breda, Netherlands. It was used for football matches and hosted the home matches of NAC Breda. The stadium was opened in 1913 and demolished in 1916.

Defunct football venues in the Netherlands
NAC Breda
Sports venues in Breda
Sports venues completed in 1913
Sports venues demolished in 1916
History of Breda